Mill Creek East is a census-designated place (CDP) located in Snohomish County, Washington. The population was 24,912 at the 2020 census. The CDP comprises an area southeast of the city of Mill Creek that includes many new single-family housing developments as well as the new North Creek High School.

Demographics

2020 census
As of the census of 2020, there were 24,912 people, 8,176 households, and 7,587 families living in the CDP. There were 7,587 housing units. The racial makeup of the CDP was 56.8% White, 2.4% African American, 0.8% Native American, 32.6% Asian, 0.3% Pacific Islander, 1.3% from other races, and 6.0% from two or more races. Hispanic or Latino of any race were 7.2% of the population.

Geography
Mill Creek East is located at coordinates 47°50'10 "N 122°11'16"W.

References

Census-designated places in Snohomish County, Washington